The 2019 Richmondshire District Council election took place on 2 May 2019 to elect members of Richmondshire District Council in England. This was on the same day as other local elections. At the election, the Conservatives lost control of the council.

Ward Results

Catterick and Brompton-on-Swale

Colburn

Croft and Middleton Tyas

Gilling West

Hawes, High Abbotside and Upper Swaledale

Hipswell

Leyburn

Lower Swaledale and Arkengarthdale

Lower Wensleydale

Melsonby

Middleham

Richmond East

Richmond North

Richmond West

Scotton

Yoredale

References 

Richmondshire District Council elections
2019 English local elections
2010s in North Yorkshire
May 2019 events in the United Kingdom